Achin may refer to:

Achin District, in Nangarhar Province, Afghanistan
A previous name of Aceh, Indonesia
Nancy Achin Sullivan (1959-2022), American politician

See also
 Achina (disambiguation)